Sorosis was the first professional women's club in the United States. It was established in March 1868 in New York City.

History
The club was organized in New York City with 12 members in March 1868, by Jane Cunningham Croly. Among its founding members were Josephine Pollard, a children's author, and Fanny Fern, a popular columnist who had been angered at newspaper women being excluded from the all-male New York Press Club when it had an honorary dinner for the author Charles Dickens the month before. Sorosis was incorporated in January 1869. Alice Cary was the first president. Within one year, Sorosis had 83 members. Along with Boston's New England Woman's Club (also founded in 1868), Sorosis inspired the formation of women's clubs across the country. 

Sorosis is a latinate word meaning 'aggregation' (from the Greek sōros, meaning ‘heap’). Its object was to further the educational and social activities of women by bringing representative women of accomplishment in art, literature, science, and kindred pursuits.

Early members of Sorosis were participants in varied professions and political reform movements such as abolitionism, suffrage, prison reform, temperance and peace. Sorosis expanded into local chapters beyond New York City in the early twentieth century and the various chapters went on to organize war relief efforts during both World Wars. Peacetime activities included philanthropy (such as support for funding the MacDowell Colony), scholarship funds, and social reforms (such as literary training for immigrant women). In later years, Sorosis focused its activities on local projects, raising money for the aid of other women's clubs, funding scholarships for women, and aiding local rescue missions.

Sorosis was among the 63 clubs that formed the General Federation of Women's Clubs in 1890.

The University of Texas at San Antonio houses a collection of records for the San Antonio chapter of Sorosis. The collection spans the years 1923 through 1991 and provides information about the club's members and activities primarily through minutes, photographs, scrapbooks and yearbooks.

Notable members

 Elizabeth Akers Allen, poet and journalist
 Celia M. Burleigh, activist for women's rights.
 Alice Cary, first president of Sorosis
 R. Belle Colver, Spokane
 Jane Cunningham Croly, first vice-president of Sorosis
 Emily Faithfull, honorary foreign member
 Fanny Fern, columnist
 Kate Field, first corresponding secretary of Sorosis
 Fannie Smith Goble, president and treasurer of Spokane Sorosis Club
 Phebe Ann Coffin Hanaford, minister and suffragist
 Sophia Curtiss Hoffman, philanthropist
 Jennie de la Montagnie Lozier, physician, president
 Virgie McFarland, member 
 Rebecca A. Morse
 Jessie Fremont O'Donnell (1860–1897), writer
 Josephine Pollard, children's author 
 Emily Warren Roebling, assistant to and wife of Washington A. Roebling, Brooklyn Bridge Chief Engineer
 Kate Funk Simpson
 Isabel Elizabeth Smith, chairman of the art committee
 May Riley Smith, poet, president of the club 1911-1915, honorary president 1919-1927
 M. Louise Thomas (1822-1907), fourth president
 Phoebe Jane Babcock Wait, physician
Charlotte Beebe Wilbour, founding member, feminist, speaker, and writer

See also
 New England Women's Club
 Pi Beta Phi, originally founded in 1867 as I. C. Sorosis

References

Further reading
 Rakow, Lana F. and Kramarae, Cheris, Women's Source Library, Vol. IV: The Revolution in Words, pp. 243–245

External links
 University of Texas collection of records for the San Antonio chapter of Sorosis (1923–1991) 
Sorosis records at the Sophia Smith Collection, Smith College Special Collections
 Article about Sorosis at About.com

Sorosis
Sorosis
History of women in New York City
Women's clubs in the United States
Sorosis